Daniel Muñoz-de la Nava and Rubén Ramírez Hidalgo were the defending champions but decided not to participate.
Goran Tošić and Denis Zivkovic won the final against Andrei Dăescu and Florin Mergea 6–2, 7–5.

Seeds

Draw

Draw

References
 Main Draw

BRD Timisoara Challenger - Doubles
2012 Doubles